United Air Lines Flight 615 was a US transcontinental east–west airline service from Boston to Hartford, Cleveland, Chicago, Oakland and San Francisco. On August 24, 1951, the Douglas DC-6 with registration  operating the service, crashed on approach to Oakland, causing the death of all 44 passengers and 6 crew members on board.

The flight departed Chicago at 10:59 p.m. CST en route to Oakland. At around 4:16 a.m., the plane was approaching Oakland. At this time, the pilot, Marion W. Hedden of Los Altos, had talked with the control tower of the Civil Aeronautics Administration at the airport preparing for his landing, and had mentioned no trouble. At 4:25 a.m. Flight 615 was cleared for the straight-in approach into Oakland.

This approach clearance was the last radio transmission with the flight. All 50 persons on board perished.

After an investigation, it was determined that the pilot ignored the prescribed instrument landing procedures. The pilot instead relied on visual reference, using the copilot's automatic direction finder (ADF).

See also

 List of accidents and incidents involving commercial aircraft

References

External links
 
 Report - Civil Aeronautics Board - PDF
Union City History - Crash of Flight 615 - includes period photographs and a chart excerpt from CAB report
Wreckchasing.com - United Airlines Flight 615 - includes hiking directions to the crash site
Check-Six.com - The Crash of United Airline Flight #615 - includes full crew and passenger list
Mishalov.com - The Crash of a DC-6B in Alameda County, California - includes current-day photographs of crash site and topographic map
 from Airdisaster.com
 

Airliner accidents and incidents involving controlled flight into terrain
Aviation accidents and incidents in the United States in 1951
History of Alameda County, California
615
Disasters in California
Accidents and incidents involving the Douglas DC-6
Airliner accidents and incidents in California
Union City, California
1951 in California
August 1951 events in the United States